Josep Gumbau was a Spanish footballer who played as a forward. The dates of his birth and death are unknown.

Club career
Born in Catalonia, he began his career at his hometown club FC Martinenc, where he stood out for his goalscoring ability, which eventually drew the attention of FC Barcelona, who signed him in 1917, and despite scoring 19 goals in 35 caps, he failed to help the club win any trophies and thus he returned to Martinenc at the end of the 1917–18 season. In 1921, he joined CE Júpiter where he ended his career in 1924.

International career
When he joined FC Barcelona in 1917, he was summoned to play for the Catalonia national team, being a member of the Catalan side that participated in the 1917 Prince of Asturias Cup, an inter-regional competition organized by the RFEF. Gumbau started in all three games and scored twice, in a 2–2 draw with Castile/Madrid XI and the only goal of a 1–0 over Cantabric, but despite his efforts, Catalonia ended up as runner-ups after losing the decisive game to Madrid (0-2).

Honours

International
Catalonia
Prince of Asturias Cup:
Runner-up (1): 1917

References

Year of birth missing
Year of death missing
Footballers from Catalonia
Spanish footballers
Association football forwards
FC Martinenc players
FC Barcelona players
CE Júpiter players
Catalonia international footballers